Nepeytsino is a rural locality (a village) in Andreyevskoye Rural Settlement, Sudogodsky District, Vladimir Oblast, Russia. The population was 30 as of 2010.

Geography 
Nepeytsino is located 30 km northeast of Sudogda (the district's administrative centre) by road. Bolshaya Kozlovka is the nearest rural locality.

References 

Rural localities in Sudogodsky District